"Feel So Right" is MAX's 22nd single on the Avex Trax label and was released on December 5, 2001. The title track was used as the first ending theme to anime series, Captain Tsubasa: Road to 2002. MAX performed the song on their fifth appearance on NHK singing contest, Kōhaku Uta Gassen.

Track list

Production

Music
 Executive producer - Johnny Taira
 Producer - Max Matsuura
 Co-producer - Junichi "Randy" Tsuchiya
 Mixing - Hiroto Kobayashi
 Mastering - Shigeo Miyamoto

Feel So Right
 Arrangement - Cobra Endo
 Programming - David Huff, Cobra Endo
 Guitars - Dave Cleveland
 Chorus - Yumi Kawamura

Manatsu no Eve
 Arrangement - Takehiro Kawabe
 Programming - Takehiro Kawabe
 Guitars - Takehiro Kawabe
 Chorus - Yumi Kawamura

Art direction & design
 Art direction & design - Katsuhiro Tadokoro
 Photography - Zigen
 Stylist - Akarumi Someya
 Hair & make-up - Keiichi
 Coordinator - Naoki Ueda

Charts
Oricon Sales Chart (Japan)

References

2001 singles
MAX (band) songs
Song recordings produced by Max Matsuura
2001 songs
Avex Trax singles
Songs written by Ari Lehtonen